This is a list of the active and inactive Space Launch Complexes (SLC) and Intercontinental Ballistic Missile (ICBM) Launch Facilities (LF) at Vandenberg Space Force Base.

Active launch Complex

Inactive launch sites

Active ICBM testing sites

Inactive ICBM testing sites

References 

Vandenberg Space Force Base